Long Sơn may refer to several commune-level subdivisions in Vietnam, including:

Long Sơn, An Giang, a ward of Tân Châu, An Giang
Long Sơn, Thái Hòa, a ward of Thái Hòa in Nghệ An Province
Long Sơn, Vũng Tàu, a commune of Vũng Tàu consisting Long Sơn Island
Long Sơn, Bắc Giang, a commune of Sơn Động District
Long Sơn, Đắk Nông, a commune of Đăk Mil District
Long Sơn, Hòa Bình, a commune of Lương Sơn District
Long Sơn, Long An, a commune of Cần Đước District
Long Sơn, Anh Sơn, a commune of Anh Sơn District in Nghệ An Province
Long Sơn, Quảng Ngãi, a commune of Minh Long District
Long Sơn, Trà Vinh, a commune of Cầu Ngang District